Nils Quaschner (born 22 April 1994) is a German former professional footballer who played as a striker.

Career
Quaschner started his professional career at Hansa Rostock. On 17 July 2013, he joined FC Liefering. On 12 January 2015, he signed with RB Leipzig.

On 5 July 2017, he signed with Arminia Bielefeld. Quaschner retired due to injury problems in 2020, after his contract with Arminia Bielefeld had expired.

Career statistics

References

External links
 
 

1994 births
Living people
Association football forwards
German footballers
German expatriate footballers
Germany youth international footballers
FC Hansa Rostock players
FC Liefering players
FC Red Bull Salzburg players
RB Leipzig players
VfL Bochum players
2. Bundesliga players
3. Liga players
Austrian Football Bundesliga players
Expatriate footballers in Austria
People from Stralsund
Footballers from Mecklenburg-Western Pomerania